Daniel Josefsson (born October 15, 1981) is a Swedish professional ice hockey player currently playing with HC Vita Hästen of the HockeyAllsvenskan (Allsv). Josefsson has previously played in the Swedish Hockey League (SHL) with HV71, Södertälje SK, Modo Hockey, AIK IF and Leksands IF.

References

External links 

1981 births
Living people
AIK IF players
HV71 players
Leksands IF players
Malmö Redhawks players
Modo Hockey players
Rögle BK players
Södertälje SK players
Swedish ice hockey defencemen
HC Vita Hästen players